Georg Krause (15 April 1901 – 3 January 1986) was a German cinematographer who worked on more than a hundred and thirty film and television productions during his career. In 1957 he worked on Stanley Kubrick's Paths of Glory.

Selected filmography

 Heads Up, Charley (1927)
 Ways to a Good Marriage (1933)
 The Two Seals (1934)
 All Because of the Dog (1935)
 Every Day Isn't Sunday (1935)
 His Late Excellency (1935)
 Port Arthur (1936)
 Port Arthur (1936)
 Adventure in Warsaw (1937)
 The Beaver Coat (1937)
 The Stars Shine (1938)
 Secret Code LB 17 (1938)
 D III 88 (1939)
 Battle Squadron Lützow (1941)
 Diesel (1942)
 The Green Salon (1944)
 The Enchanted Day (1944)
 Music in Salzburg (1944)
 The Berliner (1948)
 Crown Jewels (1950)
 When the Evening Bells Ring (1951)
 Monks, Girls and Hungarian Soldiers (1952)
 Man on a Tightrope (1953)
 We'll Talk About Love Later (1953)
 The Night Without Morals (1953)
 I'll See You at Lake Constance (1956)
 Paths of Glory (1957)
 The Devil Strikes at Night (1957)
 The Doctor of Stalingrad (1958)
 Taiga (1958)
 Dorothea Angermann (1959)
 Island of the Amazons (1960)
 Melody of Hate (1962)
 Escape from East Berlin (1962)
 Encounter in Salzburg (1964)

References

Bibliography 
 Bergfelder, Tim. International Adventures: German Popular Cinema and European Co-Productions in the 1960s. Berhahn Books, 2005.

External links 
 

1901 births
1986 deaths
German cinematographers
Mass media people from Berlin